The 2004 WNBA season was the sixth for the Minnesota Lynx. The Lynx qualified for their second consecutive playoff berth, but lost in the opening round to eventual champion Seattle Storm.

Offseason

Dispersal Draft
Based on the Lynx's 2003 record, they would pick 7th in the Cleveland Rockers dispersal draft. The Lynx picked Helen Darling.

WNBA Draft

Regular season

Season standings

Season schedule

Playoffs

Player stats

Awards and honors
Teresa Edwards, Kim Perrot Sportsmanship Award
Suzie McConnell Serio, WNBA Coach of the Year Award

References

External links
Lynx on Basketball Reference

Minnesota Lynx seasons
Minnesota
Minnesota Lynx